Greendale is an unincorporated community in Clay and Marion counties, Illinois, United States. Greendale is located on U.S. Route 50 west of Xenia and east of Iuka.

References

Unincorporated communities in Clay County, Illinois
Unincorporated communities in Marion County, Illinois
Unincorporated communities in Illinois